Hanan Al-Zeyoudi is an Emirati boxer.

Career 
Her first major international competition was the 2019 Asian Amateur Boxing Championships, after the AIBA allowed competitors to wear a hijab. Along with Fahima Falaknaz, she became one of the first female boxers from the UAE to participate in international competitions.

At the 2021 Asian Amateur Boxing Championships she secured a bronze medal.

She has qualified for the upcoming 2021 AIBA World Boxing Championships.

References 

1995 births
Living people
Emirati women boxers